Yapleu is a town in western Ivory Coast. It is a sub-prefecture of Man Department in Tonkpi Region, Montagnes District.

Yapleu was a commune until March 2012, when it became one of 1126 communes nationwide that were abolished.
In 2014, the population of the sub-prefecture of Yapleu was 7,735.

In 2014, the population of the sub-prefecture of Yapleu was 7,735.

Villages
The only two villages of the sub-prefecture of Yapleu and their population in 2014 are:
 Tontigouiné (1 063)
 Yapleu (6 672)

Notes

Sub-prefectures of Tonkpi
Former communes of Ivory Coast